The 2021 Copa Paraguay was the third edition of the Copa Paraguay, Paraguay's domestic football cup competition. Originally known as the 2020 Copa Paraguay, the competition was scheduled to start on 14 April 2020 and conclude in late 2020, with the winners qualifying for the 2021 Copa Sudamericana as well as the 2020 Supercopa Paraguay against the Primera División champions with better record in the aggregate table.

The competition was suspended indefinitely due to the COVID-19 pandemic. On 9 July 2020, Paraguayan Football Association's Chief of Competitions Michael Sánchez stated that it would be postponed to 2021 with the same qualified teams given the unavailability of stadiums in the departments of Paraguay as well as the lack of dates to reschedule the competition in the remainder of 2020. As a result, the berth to the 2021 Copa Sudamericana was passed to the best team in the Primera División season that failed to qualify for international competition. The decision to suspend the competition was confirmed by the APF on 11 September 2020.

On 15 January 2021, the APF confirmed that the Copa Paraguay would be resumed in 2021, with this edition keeping the same format and fixture elaborated for the 2020 edition. On 15 July 2021, the APF announced that the competition would start on 27 July 2021.

Olimpia won their first Copa Paraguay title, beating Sol de América on penalties after a 2–2 draw over 90 minutes in the final. The winners qualified for the 2021 Supercopa Paraguay against the Primera División champions with better record in the aggregate table, with runners-up Sol de América qualifying for the 2022 Copa Sudamericana since Olimpia had already qualified for international competition on league performance. Libertad were the defending champions but were defeated by Olimpia in the semi-finals.

Format
64 teams took part, with the competition keeping the same format used in the previous edition. The competition is played as a single-elimination tournament, with all teams directly qualifying for the first round, where they were drawn into 32 single-legged ties. Ties in all rounds will be played as a single game, with a penalty shootout deciding the winner in case of a draw.

Teams
64 teams competed in this edition of the competition: the 10 Primera División and 18 División Intermedia teams, as well as 11 from the Primera B, 8 from the Primera C, and the 17 champions from each department of Paraguay representing the UFI.

Primera División
All of the 10 Primera División teams took part in the competition:

 12 de Octubre (I)
 Cerro Porteño
 Guaireña
 Guaraní
 Libertad
 Nacional
 Olimpia
 River Plate
 Sol de América
 Sportivo Luqueño

División Intermedia
All of the 18 División Intermedia teams took part:

 2 de Mayo
 3 de Febrero (CDE)
 Atyrá
 Deportivo Capiatá
 Deportivo Santaní
 Fernando de la Mora
 Fulgencio Yegros
 General Caballero (JLM)
 General Díaz
 Guaraní (T)
 Independiente (CG)
 Resistencia
 Rubio Ñu
 San Lorenzo
 Sportivo Ameliano
 Sportivo Iteño
 Sportivo Trinidense
 Tacuary

Primera B
The 9 teams ranked from 2nd to 10th place in the 2019 Primera B season and the top two in the 2019 Primera C season qualified:

 3 de Febrero (RB)
 12 de Octubre (SD)
 24 de Setiembre (VP)
 29 de Setiembre
 Cristóbal Colón (JAS)
 Cristóbal Colón (Ñ)
 Olimpia (I)
 Presidente Hayes
 Recoleta
 Sportivo Limpeño
 Tembetary

Primera C
Teams ranked from 3rd to 10th place in the previous Primera C season qualified: 

 Atlético Juventud
 Benjamín Aceval
 Deportivo Pinozá
 General Caballero (CG)
 Humaitá
 Oriental
 Silvio Pettirossi
 Sport Colonial

UFI
The champions from each of the 17 departments of Paraguay qualified for the competition:

 Teniente Rojas (Concepción)
 12 de Octubre (VR) (San Pedro)
 5 de Octubre (Cordillera)
 Karai Chivé (Guairá)
 Atlético Mil Palos (Caaguazú)
 Coronel Martínez (Caazapá)
 22 de Setiembre (Itapúa)
 24 de Junio (Misiones)
 Deportivo La Colmena (Paraguarí)
 Deportivo Primavera (Alto Paraná)
 Ytororó (Central)
 1° de Marzo FBC (Ñeembucú)
 Mariscal Estigarribia (Amambay)
 Sport Pacobá (Canindeyú)
 Independiente (N) (Presidente Hayes)
 Atlético Trébol (Boquerón)
 Sport Sastreño (Alto Paraguay)

Round of 64
The draw for the round of 64 was held on 9 March 2020 and the matches were scheduled to be played from 14 April 2020 onwards. On 15 July 2021, the APF confirmed that the round of 64 games would be played from 27 July to 26 August 2021.

Round of 32
The schedule for the round of 32 was confirmed by the APF on 26 August 2021. Matches in this round were played from 1 to 23 September 2021.

Bracket

Round of 16
The schedule for the round of 16 was announced by the APF on 28 September 2021. Matches in this round were played from 5 to 20 October 2021.

Quarter-finals
The schedule for the quarter-finals was announced by the APF on 22 October 2021. Matches in this round were played from 3 to 10 November 2021.

Semi-finals
The schedule for the semi-finals was announced by the APF on 7 November 2021. Both matches were played on 14 November 2021 at Estadio Defensores del Chaco in Asunción.

Third place play-off

Final

References

External links
Copa Paraguay on the official website of the Paraguayan Football Association 
Copa Paraguay 2021, Soccerway.com

Copa Paraguay
Copa Paraguay
C